This is a list of video games that have been recalled for various reasons after their initial release and then rereleased on a later date.

List

See also 
 Lists of video games

References 

Recalled
Product recalls